Arhopala alaconia is a species of butterfly belonging to the lycaenid family described by William Chapman Hewitson in 1869. It is found in Southeast Asia (Borneo, Burma, Thailand, Peninsular Malaya and Palawan).

Subspecies
Arhopala alaconia alaconia (Borneo)
Arhopala alaconia aloana Corbet, 1941 (central Burma)
Arhopala alaconia media (Evans, 1957) (Mergui, southern Thailand, Peninsular Malaysia)
Arhopala alaconia oberthuri (Staudinger, 1889) (Palawan)

References

External links
"Arhopala Boisduval, 1832" at Markku Savela's Lepidoptera and Some Other Life Forms. Retrieved June 7, 2017.

Arhopala
Butterflies described in 1869
Butterflies of Asia
Taxa named by William Chapman Hewitson